The 1890–91 Doane Tigers football team represented Doane College in the 1890 college football season. Doane's game against Nebraska represented the first intercollegiate game of football in the history of the state of Nebraska.

Schedule

References

Doane
Doane Tigers football seasons
Doane Tigers football